Gerda Roosval-Kallstenius (10 February 1864, Kalmar – 21 August 1939, Västervik) was a Swedish painter who specialized in landscapes and scenes with figures.

Life and career 
She was the daughter of businessman John Roosval and Johanna Kramer. Her father's family produced several notables in the world of the creative arts, including her maternal uncles, the art historian Johnny Roosval and early filmmaker .

Roosval-Kallstenius grew up in Kalmar and was sent to Montreux after completing her girls' school, where she deepened her French skills and gained artistic inspiration. After returning to Kalmar in June 1881, she was taught drawing and painting by Christine Sundberg, one of the first women to study at the Royal Swedish Academy of Fine Arts. In 1884, Roosval-Kallstenius moved to Stockholm to study at the Technical School (now Konstfack) until 1885. At this time she received guidance in painting from Ferdinand Stoopendaal. These preparatory studies eventually resulted in her being admitted to the Academy of Fine Arts in the autumn of 1886.

In 1891 she married fellow painter Gottfrid Kallstenius. Their son, also became an artist.

After her husband received a scholarship, they went to Paris and settled at the Swedish art colony at Grez-sur-Loing. While there, she continued her training with Raphaël Collin. After traveling to Italy, the couple returned to Sweden in 1896.

Death
She died on 21 August 1939 in Västervik.

Picture gallery

References

Further reading
 Charlotte Klingberg, En blå hyacint i Paris: Gerda Roosval-Kallstenius, hennes värld och verk, Rönnells antikvariat, 2009,  
 Svenska konstnärer, Biografisk handbok, Väbo förlag, 1987, pg.262,

External links
 
 More works by Roosval-Kallstenius @ ArtNet

1864 births
1939 deaths
19th-century Swedish painters
20th-century Swedish painters
20th-century Swedish women artists
19th-century Swedish women artists
People from Kalmar